Left to Die is an extended play by death metal band Obituary.

Track listing

Personnel
 John Tardy - vocals
 Ralph Santolla - lead guitar
 Trevor Peres - rhythm guitar
 Frank Watkins - bass
 Donald Tardy - drums

References 

2008 EPs
Obituary (band) albums